Abon Plastic SRL is an Italian manufacturer of thermoform plastics packaging. The company's headquarters are located near Milan, Italy in Gornate-Olona, Varese.

Abon Plastic's products include blister packs, clamshells, holding and display trays, and stackable takeout pizza trays. Their clients include Sony Corporation, Philips Electronics and L'Oreal Paris.  They are involved in specialty packaging for the Cosmetic, Electronics, Specialty Lighting (L.E.D's), as well as Food and Beverage industries. They invented and patented a stackable takeout pizza container called Piattopak.

References 

Plastics companies of Italy
Manufacturing companies of Italy
Companies based in Lombardy